The Singles is a compilation album/box set by the Doors, released on September 15, 2017. It contains both the A-sides and B-sides of all 20 US singles released between 1967 and 1983. 

The collection was released in several formats: a vinyl box set containing 20 7-inch singles in packaging replicating the original singles; a double CD version containing four bonus mono radio tracks; and a three-disc deluxe edition containing the double CD version plus a bonus Blu-ray disc containing the quadraphonic mix of the 1973 album The Best of the Doors. All tracks were mastered from the original analog master tapes by the band's longtime engineer Bruce Botnick.

Track listing
All songs written by the Doors (Jim Morrison, Ray Manzarek, Robby Krieger, John Densmore) unless otherwise stated. Details are taken from the 2017 Rhino release; other releases may show different information.  All songs stereo except those indicated otherwise or marked by an asterisk; track times are taken from gapless electronic playback, as none are stated on the album itself.

Charts

References

2017 compilation albums
The Doors compilation albums
Elektra Records compilation albums
Rhino Records compilation albums